The 1978 Maine Black Bears football team was an American football team that represented the University of Maine as a member of the Yankee Conference during the 1978 NCAA Division I-AA football season. In its third season under head coach Jack Bicknell, the team compiled a 3–7–1 record (0–4–1 against conference opponents) and finished last in the Yankee Conference. Chris Keating and William LeRoy were the team captains.

Schedule

References

Maine
Maine Black Bears football seasons
Maine Black Bears football